Chen Bai-sun (born 2 May 1932) is a Taiwanese boxer. He competed in the men's light middleweight event at the 1964 Summer Olympics. At the 1964 Summer Olympics, he lost to Tom Bogs of Denmark.

References

1932 births
Living people
Taiwanese male boxers
Olympic boxers of Taiwan
Boxers at the 1964 Summer Olympics
Place of birth missing (living people)
Light-middleweight boxers